Ayokunle Olatunji "T. J." Fatinikun (born July 28, 1991) is an American football defensive end who is currently a free agent. He played college football at the University of Toledo and attended Perrysburg High School in Perrysburg, Ohio. He has been a member of the Portland Thunder, Orlando Predators and Tampa Bay Buccaneers.

Early years
Fatinikun played high school football for the Perrysburg High School Yellow Jackets. He was named first-team all-conference, first-team all-district and special mention all-state. He recorded 65 tackles, 18 tackles for loss and nine sacks his senior year. Fatinikun made second-team all-league, recording 55 tackles, 11 tackles for loss and seven sacks his junior year. In his Junior year, he also led the Yellow Jackets to their first State Playoff berth in school history. He totaled 73 tackles, 15 tackles for loss and 10 sacks as a sophomore.

College career
Fatinikun played for the Toledo Rockets from 2009 to 2012. Fatinikun was named third-team All-MAC in 2010, leading the defensive line with 51 tackles. He also led the team and was ninth in the MAC with 13 tackles for loss. He suffered a season-ending elbow injury against Eastern Michigan on October 8, 2011, still making third-team All-MAC.

Professional career
Fatinikun was assigned to the Portland Thunder of the Arena Football League on October 18, 2013. He was traded to the Orlando Predators on May 26, 2014. He was placed on Other League Exempt on August 12, 2014.

Fatinikun was signed by the Tampa Bay Buccaneers of the National Football League on August 12, 2014. He was released by the Buccaneers on August 29, 2014. He was signed to the Buccaneers' practice squad on September 24, 2014 and promoted to the active roster on October 21, 2014. Fatinikun was placed on injured reserve with a knee injury on October 6, 2015. He was taken off injured reserve on February 8, 2016 and became a free agent on March 9, 2016.

References

External links
Just Sports Stats
NFL Draft Scout
College stats

Living people
1991 births
Players of American football from Ohio
American football defensive ends
Nigerian players of American football
Toledo Rockets football players
Portland Thunder players
Orlando Predators players
Tampa Bay Buccaneers players
Nigerian emigrants to the United States
American people of Yoruba descent
Yoruba sportspeople
People from Perrysburg, Ohio
Sportspeople from Lagos